In quantum mechanics, the Wigner 3-j symbols, also called 3-jm symbols, are an alternative to Clebsch–Gordan coefficients for the purpose of adding angular momenta. While the two approaches address exactly the same physical problem, the 3-j symbols do so more symmetrically.

Mathematical relation to Clebsch–Gordan coefficients 

The 3-j symbols are given in terms of the Clebsch–Gordan coefficients by

The j and m components are angular-momentum quantum numbers, i.e., every  (and every corresponding ) is either a nonnegative integer or half-odd-integer. The exponent of the sign factor is always an integer, so it remains the same when transposed to the left, and the inverse relation follows upon making the substitution :

Definitional relation to Clebsch–Gordan coefficients 

The CG coefficients are defined so as to express the addition of two angular momenta in terms of a third:

The 3-j symbols, on the other hand, are the coefficients with which three angular momenta must be added so that the resultant is zero:

Here  is the zero-angular-momentum state. It is apparent that the 3-j symbol treats all three angular momenta involved in the addition problem on an equal footing and is therefore more symmetrical than the CG coefficient.

Since the state  is unchanged by rotation, one also says that the contraction of the product of three rotational states with a 3-j symbol is invariant under rotations.

Selection rules 

The Wigner 3-j symbol is zero unless all these conditions are satisfied:

Symmetry properties 
A 3-j symbol is invariant under an even permutation of its columns:

An odd permutation of the columns gives a phase factor:

Changing the sign of the  quantum numbers (time reversal) also gives a phase:

The 3-j symbols also have so-called Regge symmetries, which are not due to permutations or time reversal. These symmetries are:

With the Regge symmetries, the 3-j symbol has a total of 72 symmetries. These are best displayed by the definition of a Regge symbol, which is a one-to-one correspondence between it and a 3-j symbol and assumes the properties of a semi-magic square:

whereby the 72 symmetries now correspond to 3! row and 3! column interchanges plus a transposition of the matrix. These facts can be used to devise an effective storage scheme.

Orthogonality relations 
The 3-j symbols constitute a unitary transformation between these two bases, and this unitarity implies the orthogonality relations

The triangular delta  is equal to 1 when the triad (j1, j2, j3) satisfies the triangle conditions, and is zero otherwise. The triangular delta itself is sometimes confusingly called a "3-j symbol" (without the m) in analogy to 6-j and 9-j symbols, all of which are irreducible summations of 3-jm symbols where no  variables remain.

Relation to spherical harmonics; Gaunt coefficients
The 3-jm symbols give the integral of the products of three spherical harmonics 

These integrals are called Gaunt coefficients.

Relation to integrals of spin-weighted spherical harmonics 

Similar relations exist for the spin-weighted spherical harmonics if :

Recursion relations

Asymptotic expressions 
For  a non-zero 3-j symbol is

Generally a better approximation obeying the Regge symmetry is given by 

where .

Metric tensor 

The following quantity acts as a metric tensor in angular-momentum theory and is also known as a Wigner 1-jm symbol:

It can be used to perform time reversal on angular momenta.

Special cases and other properties 

From equation (3.7.9) in 

where P are Legendre polynomials.

Relation to Racah -coefficients 

Wigner 3-j symbols are related to Racah -coefficients by a simple phase:

Relation to group theory 
This section essentially recasts the definitional relation
in the language of group theory.

A group representation of a group is a homomorphism of the group into
a group of linear transformations over some vector space. The linear
transformations can be given by a group of matrices with respect to some basis of the vector space.

The group of transformations leaving angular momenta invariant is the three dimensional rotation group SO(3). 
When "spin" angular momenta are included, the group is its double covering group,   SU(2).

A reducible representation is one where a change of basis can be applied to bring all the matrices into block diagonal form. A representation
is irreducible (irrep) if no such transformation exists.

For each value of j, the 2j+1 kets form a basis for an irreducible representation (irrep)     
of SO(3)/SU(2) over the complex numbers. Given two
irreps, the tensor direct product  can be reduced to a
sum of irreps, giving rise to the Clebcsh-Gordon coefficients, or by reduction of the triple product 
of three irreps to the trivial irrep 1 giving rise to the 3j symbols.

3j symbols for other groups 
The  symbol has been most intensely studied in the context of the 
coupling of angular momentum. For this, it is strongly related to the
group representation theory of the groups SU(2) and SO(3)
as discussed above. However, many
other groups are of importance in physics and 
chemistry,
and there has been much work on the  symbol for these other groups.
In this section, some of that work is considered.

Simply reducible groups 
The original paper by Wigner
was not restricted to SO(3)/SU(2)
but instead focussed on simply reducible (SR) groups.
These are groups in which
 all classes are ambivalent i.e. if  is a member of a class then so is 
 the Kronecker product of two irreps is multiplicity free i.e. does not contain any irrep more than once.
For SR groups, every irrep is equivalent to its complex conjugate,
and under permutations of the columns the absolute value of the
symbol is invariant and the phase of each can be chosen so that
they at most change sign under odd permutations and remain
unchanged under even permutations.

General compact groups 
Compact groups form a wide class of groups with topological structure.
They include the finite groups with added discrete topology
and many of the Lie groups.

General compact groups will neither be ambivalent nor multiplicity free.
Derome and Sharp
and Derome examined the  symbol
for the general case using the relation to the Clebsch-Gordon coefficients of

By examining permutations of columns of the  symbol, they showed three cases:
 if exactly two are equivalent, then transpositions of its columns may be chosen so that some symbols will be invariant while others will change sign. Cyclic permutations leave the  symbol invariant.
 if all three are equivalent, the behaviour is dependant on the representations of the symmetric group.

Further research into  symbols for compact groups has been performed based on these principles.

SU(n) 
The Special unitary group SU(n) is the Lie group of n × n unitary matrices with determinant 1.

The group SU(3) is important in particle theory.
equivalent symbol

The  symbol for the group SU(4) has been studied

while there is also work on the general SU(n) groups

Crystallographic point groups 
There are many papers dealing with the  symbols or Clebsch-Gordon coefficients for the finite crystallographic point groups
and the double point groups
The book by Butler

references these and details the theory along with tables.

Magnetic groups 
Magnetic groups include antilinear operators as well as linear operators. They need to be dealt with using
Wigner's theory of corepresentations of unitary and antiunitary groups.
A significant departure from standard representation theory is that the multiplicity of the irreducible corepresentation 
in the direct product of the irreducible corepresentations 
is generally smaller than the multiplicity of the trivial corepresentation in the triple
product , leading to significant differences between the Clebsch-Gordon
coefficients and the  symbol.

The  symbols have been examined for the grey groups

and for the magnetic point groups

See also
Clebsch–Gordan coefficients
Spherical harmonics
6-j symbol
9-j symbol

References

L. C. Biedenharn and J. D. Louck, Angular Momentum in Quantum Physics, volume 8 of Encyclopedia of Mathematics,  Addison-Wesley, Reading, 1981.
 D. M. Brink and G. R. Satchler, Angular Momentum, 3rd edition, Clarendon, Oxford, 1993.
 A. R. Edmonds,  Angular Momentum in Quantum Mechanics, 2nd edition, Princeton University Press, Princeton, 1960.

External links
  
  (Numerical)
 
 369j-symbol calculator at the Plasma Laboratory of Weizmann Institute of Science (Numerical)
 Frederik J Simons: Matlab software archive, the code THREEJ.M
 Sage (mathematics software) Gives exact answer for any value of j, m
  (accurate; C, fortran, python)
  (fast lookup, accurate; C, fortran)

Rotational symmetry
Representation theory of Lie groups
Quantum mechanics